Cromagnetic is an album by Gruvis Malt. It was released independently in 1998

Track listing
"Maple Syrup... French Toast"
"Rubix Do"
"Adidas"
"Space Invasion"
"Cozmic"
"Ninja Gil
"Wax On" (radio edit)
"The Ticket"
"Canyoodigit"
"Wax Off" (remixed nuts)
"Neck Protection" (Rubix Redo) live at the Beachcomber
"PM live on 95.5 WBRU"

See also
Album Maximum Unicorn
Album ...With the Spirit of a Traffic Jam...
Album Sound Soldiers

Gruvis Malt albums
1998 albums